Falcatula penumbra is a moth of the family Sphingidae. It is known from Zambia and the Democratic Republic of the Congo.

It is very similar to Falcatula falcatus, but the upperside ground colour of the head, thorax and wings is darker brown with a more strongly developed pattern of dark brown transverse lines and bands.

References

Smerinthini
Moths described in 1936